Last Man Standing is a 1996 American action film written and directed by Walter Hill and starring Bruce Willis, Christopher Walken, and Bruce Dern. It is a credited remake of Akira Kurosawa's Yojimbo.

Plot
In Prohibition-era Texas, a wanderer named John Smith (Bruce Willis) drives his Ford Model A Coupe into the small bordertown of Jericho. As he arrives, a young woman named Felina (Karina Lombard) crosses the street, catching Smith's eye. Moments later, a group of Irish mobsters led by Finn (Patrick Kilpatrick) surround Smith's car. They warn him against staring at "Doyle's property" and smash up his car.

Stranded and with no money to get his car fixed, Smith goes to see Sheriff Ed Galt (Bruce Dern); the cowardly Galt refuses to help him. Instead, Smith walks to the town hotel, run by Joe Monday (William Sanderson), gets a drink and a room, and takes two M1911 pistols out of his luggage. He then goes to Doyle's headquarters at a nearby social club and challenges Finn to a duel, which Smith wins with alarming speed. Smith departs and returns to the hotel, much to the surprise of Jericho's residents. 

Learning of Finn's death, Fredo Strozzi (Ned Eisenberg), the head of Jericho's Italian gang, offers Smith a job in his outfit. Strozzi is eager to wipe out his rivals and is spending heavily to recruit anyone who can fight into his gang. Smith agrees to his offer and meets Giorgio Carmonte (Michael Imperioli), son of a prominent Chicago mobster who is monitoring Strozzi's activities in Jericho. Carmonte expresses his immediate distrust and dislike of Smith, who leaves and then seduces Strozzi's mistress, Lucy (Alexandra Powers).

Smith accompanies Strozzi and his men to the backcountry, where they meet Ramirez, a corrupt Mexican police lieutenant on Doyle's payroll. The gang ambushes Doyle's men and seizes a caravan of illicit foreign liquor. Carmonte travels to Mexico to cut more deals with Ramirez, while Doyle (David Patrick Kelly) and his right-hand man Hickey (Christopher Walken) return to Jericho and are informed of Finn's death and the loss of the shipment. Smith defects to Doyle's side and reveals Ramirez's betrayal. Hickey travels to Mexico, kills Ramirez and a corrupt Border Patrol officer involved in the liquor trade, and kidnaps Carmonte. Doyle contacts Strozzi and demands a large ransom for Carmonte, as well as the return of his trucks. Strozzi in turn kidnaps Felina and offers to trade her instead. The two gangs make the exchange and return to their respective empires.

Smith is apprehended by Sheriff Galt, who brings him to meet with Captain Tom Pickett (Ken Jenkins) of the Texas Rangers. Pickett has been ordered to investigate the dead Border Patrol officer's death and warns Smith that the State of Texas will not tolerate Doyle and Strozzi's war any longer. He intends to bring a company of Rangers in ten days to wipe out both sides if one isn't destroyed within the week. As Smith leaves, Pickett warns him that if he finds him there after ten days, he'll kill him as well.

Lucy comes to Smith and reveals that Strozzi had her ear cut off for sleeping with him. Smith gives her some money and gets her a ride out of town. The next day, Smith relays a false rumor that Strozzi is preparing to bring in more men. Playing on Doyle's obsession with Felina, he convinces Doyle that Strozzi will try to kidnap her again to learn where Felina is being kept. Smith kills the men guarding Felina and gives her one of Doyle's cars to escape. The next day, Smith is waiting at the safehouse when Doyle arrives, and claims that he arrived too late to keep Strozzi from kidnapping Felina. Doyle's new enforcer, Jack McCool (R. D. Call), believes Smith's story but Hickey does not. Doyle goes berserk and declares that he will wipe out Strozzi's gang later that day.

Smith's plan goes awry when Hickey ambushes him, having received word that Felina was spotted heading towards Mexico. Doyle imprisons Smith and has him tortured, demanding to know where Felina is. Despite the heavy torture inflicted on him, Smith refuses to talk. Later that night, he overpowers his guards and escapes with Monday and Sheriff Galt. As they are driving out of town, they see Hickey and his men slaughtering Strozzi's gang at a roadhouse. Strozzi and Carmonte try to surrender but are gunned down without mercy.

Smith takes refuge at a remote church where Felina went to pray. Two days later, Sheriff Galt arrives and informs Smith that Monday was caught smuggling food and water to the church and that Doyle will probably torture him to death. He then hands Smith his pistols, saying that's all the help he's willing to offer. Smith returns to town, kills McCool and the rest of Doyle's men, and rescues Monday. Doyle and Hickey are absent, having gone down to Mexico in a desperate search for Felina. Smith lures Doyle to his location and lets Monday take revenge by shooting the gangster with his revolver. Hickey pretends to surrender and tries to kill Smith, who outdraws and shoots him dead.

In the aftermath, Smith gets into his newly repaired Ford and drives on to Mexico, his original destination.

Cast

 Bruce Willis as John Smith, a mysterious gunfighter who gets caught up in a mob war and decides to play both sides in the hopes of ending their violence as well as make some money whilst doing so. Based on the character of Sanjuro from Yojimbo.
 Bruce Dern as Sheriff Ed Galt, Jericho's inept chief lawman who fears both Strozzi and Doyle and does his best to steer clear of them. Based on the character of Hansuke from Yojimbo.
 William Sanderson as Joe Monday, an old innkeeper who shelters Smith and tries to keep him safe from both sides. Based on the character of Gonji from Yojimbo.
 Christopher Walken as Hickey, Doyle's most feared and cunning gunman. Based on the character of Unosuke from Yojimbo.
 David Patrick Kelly as Doyle, the boss of Jericho's Irish mob. Based on the character of Ushitora from Yojimbo.
 Karina Lombard as Felina, Doyle's mistress. Based on the character of Nui from Yojimbo.
 Ned Eisenberg as Fredo Strozzi, the boss of Jericho's Italian mob. Based on the character of Seibei from Yojimbo.
 Michael Imperioli as Giorgio Carmonte, a Chicago mobster working with Strozzi to expand his operations. It's later revealed that he and Fredo have a familial connection as the two are cousins. Based on the character of Orin from Yojimbo.
 R. D. Call as Jack McCool, a dimwitted mobster promoted to replace Finn as Doyle's chief enforcer. Based on the character of Inokichi from Yojimbo.
 Alexandra Powers as Lucy Kolinski, Strozzi's mistress.
 Ken Jenkins as Captain Tom Pickett, a senior Texas Ranger sent to end the violence in Jericho.
 Ted Markland as Deputy Bob, Galt's corrupt, silent  subordinate who works for Doyle. Based on the character of Kannuki from Yojimbo.
 Leslie Mann as Wanda, a prostitute who sleeps with Smith after he arrives in Jericho.
 Patrick Kilpatrick as Finn, Doyle's chief enforcer until he gets shot by Smith. Based on the character of Honma from Yojimbo.

Production

Development and writing
Walter Hill was approached by producer Arthur Sarkassian to remake the Japanese film Yojimbo (1961), which Akira Kurosawa not only directed but also co-wrote with Ryūzō Kikushima. Hill says, "It took me a long time to be persuaded to do it. I thought the very idea of adapting Mr. Kurosawa was insanity for the obvious reasons. The first movie was very, very good and in addition I would be in the long shadow of Mr. Kurosawa who is probably our most revered filmmaker."

When he learned that Kurosawa was supportive of an American remake, Hill agreed to write and direct—but on the condition that the film not be a Western (there had already been an unauthorized European remake, the Spaghetti Western A Fistful of Dollars, which had been the subject of litigation). He decided to do it as a 1930s gangster film using techniques of 1940s film noir.

"This is the story of a bad man, who as soon as he arrives begins pushing buttons and doing things only for himself", said Hill. "But we also discover that this man is at a point of spiritual crisis with himself and his own past. And this man decides that maybe he should do one good deed, even if it goes against all the rules of his life as he understands it ... The action and the violence must be organic to the story being told. I think this is obviously by its nature a very dark and very hard movie, so I think it would be dishonest to tell the story and present the physicality in a softer way. Besides, I don't think this is the most brutal film imaginable. There's actually very little blood other than in the sequence where Bruce gets beaten up."

He admitted the film was not realistic. "I don't think anything akin to the social realism movies of the 1930s is being attempted", he said. "We're into a 'once upon a time' mythic-poetic situation."

Hill signed to make the project in 1994. The film was green lit by New Line Cinema's head of production Michael De Luca who allocated a $40 million budget. The film was known by several titles including "Gundown", then "Gangster", then "Welcome to Jericho."

Hill later said that he and Bruce Willis "were not close when we did the film" but "I liked working with him. It was impersonal. Classic, 'I know what you mean. You want me to be a Bogart, Mitchum kind of guy' and I said 'Exactly. Let it happen.' He then took that and gave what I thought was a very good performance. I always sensed there was a kind of core resentment that Bruce felt he should be more appreciated for his talents. At the same time I think there is a limitation, that he does certain things better than others, and he hasn't always chosen so wisely."

Hill's original cut of the movie was over two hours long. Before Hill edited the final theatrical version his rough cut was used to edit the trailers for the movie, which is why there is lot of alternate/deleted footage shown in them, including many alternate takes, different edits of some scenes, extended versions of scenes, some extra lines of dialogue, shots and parts of deleted scenes including additional shootout sequence between two gangs and alternate ending in which Hickey is killed by Smith in a different way. Some promotional stills and pictures also show several deleted scenes.

Reception

Box office
The film was a box office bomb, grossing only a total $18,127,448 domestically by December 22, 1996, and brought in $47,267,001 worldwide.

Critical response
On Rotten Tomatoes the film has a 39% approval rating based on 31 reviews. The site's consensus states: "Last Man Standing's brooding atmosphere and bursts of artfully arranged action prove intriguing yet ultimately insufficient substitutes for a consistently compelling story." Common recurring complaints address the oppressive and depressing atmosphere of the film; the flat, almost monotonous personality of Willis' character between gunfights; and the film's Pyrrhic victory finale. Audiences polled by CinemaScore gave the film an average grade of "C+" on an A+ to F scale.

Critic Roger Ebert gave the film one out of four stars, and wrote:

Last Man Standing is such a desperately cheerless film, so dry and laconic and wrung out, that you wonder if the filmmakers ever thought that in any way it could be ... fun. It contains elements that are often found in entertainments — things like guns, gangs and spectacular displays of death — but here they crouch on the screen and growl at the audience. Even the movie's hero is bad company. ... The victory at the end is downbeat, and there is an indifference to it. This is such a sad, lonely movie.

References

External links
 
 
 
 A Comparison of Yojimbo, A Fistful of Dollars and Last Man Standing

1996 films
1990s English-language films
Films scored by Ry Cooder
Films about the Irish Mob
Films about the American Mafia
Films about mass murder
Films about violence
Films directed by Walter Hill
Films set in 1932
Films set in Texas
Films shot in El Paso, Texas
New Line Cinema films
Adaptations of works by Akira Kurosawa
American remakes of Japanese films
Films with screenplays by Walter Hill
Films produced by Walter Hill
1996 drama films